Paul Oswald (born April 9, 1964) is a former American football center and guard. He played for the Pittsburgh Steelers in 1987 and for the Dallas Cowboys and Atlanta Falcons in 1988.

High school career 
He played high school football for Hayden High School in Topeka, KS. In 1982 he lead his team as a standout middle linebacker and offensive guard. He also was an outstanding wrestler in the Heavy Weight Division.

References

1964 births
Living people
American football centers
American football offensive guards
Kansas Jayhawks football players
Pittsburgh Steelers players
Dallas Cowboys players
Atlanta Falcons players